Space Warriors is a 2013 American film directed by Sean McNamara and starring Thomas Horn, Josh Lucas, and Danny Glover. The film was released in the United States on May 31, 2013.

Plot
The movie begins with a narration by Jimmy who tells his story of why he wants to go into space and be an astronaut. In the movie Jimmy Hawkins (Thomas Horn) is a young boy who dreams up becoming an astronaut, just like his father, Andy (Dermot Mulroney). His dream comes true when he wins a scholarship to Space Camp led by Commander Philips (Danny Glover) given by Col. Roy Manley (Josh Lucas). Col. Manley travels around the world recruiting young cadets. However, Jimmy's mother, Sally (Mira Sorvino), refuses because of an incident at NASA, when Andy was fired over a big fight. So Jimmy fakes a voice recorder to make it sound like his father has let him go to space camp, then lies to his mother that he is going on a fishing trip with Andy.

When he arrives at Space Camp, he becomes a member of Warriors. The group includes Rusty (Grayson Russell) the mechanic, Bao Yuen (Michael Zhang) the rocket scientist, Dani (Savannah Jayde) the robotic engineer, Sergi (Nicholas Lobue) the computer wiz, and Lacey Myers (Ryan Simpkins) the pilot. Together, they compete against the Titans led by Hunter (Thomas Kasp), the winning team to go up to the space station the following year. The games are to test their skills. During Jimmy's stay at the camp, he speaks with Andy about NASA and Andy reveals that Manley had him fired. Despite this, Andy gives Jimmy advice listening to others and learning humility. One night, while Jimmy is on a date with Lacey and camping out, Lacey says she knows about his lie. Lacey then tells him her secret, that she is actually 14 and lied on her application; she does not become 15 until tomorrow.

Meanwhile, in outer space, a Russian space station is struck by debris and begins to lose pressure. The crew head to the escape pod. However, the escape pod is designed to only carry three, so three are left behind. Houston Control is alerted about it and contacts NASA in Alabama. Things are going well for the Warriors as they are in second place until Col. Manley is told about Lacey's lie about her age, which has her expelled from Space Camp. Hunter, not wanting to lose the final competition, sabotages the Warrior's space buggy.

With Lacey expelled, the Warriors use their robotic dummy to help, but one of its wheels comes loose causing them to lose and the titans win. At Jimmy's house, Sally calls, but he does not answer, and she then calls Andy, During the call, they discover that Jimmy lied to them, believing Jimmy had run away and Sally feels bad for being hard on him. They then discover he went to Space Camp and go to pick him up. Back at camp, Conway (Booboo Stewart) and Chandra (Sahana Srinivasan) are remorseful for letting Hunter sabotage the Warriors' buggy and decide to tell Col. Manley that Hunter cheated. Manley confronts him for cheating and expels Hunter from camp. Jimmy is then called in, discovers his parents at the camp and furious at him for lying to them, which also gets Jimmy expelled.

Upon learning that the Russian astronauts are in trouble and losing air, Jimmy and Lacey go to tell Col. Manley, despite both being expelled. He decides to let them help. Despite disagrees, Col. Manley and Andy work together along with the warriors and the help of the other cadets. They were able to repair the station using roboastronauts, but despite Jimmy's heroics, he is grounded for 2 months each for lying to his parents and Col. Manley graduates him for bravely and heroics, its reveal that he took a part-time job at the space camp. In the end, Jimmy throws a party with the rest of the campers.

Cast
 Thomas Horn as Jimmy Hawkins
 Mira Sorvino as Sally Hawkins
 Dermot Mulroney as Andy Hawkins
 Josh Lucas as Colonel Roy Manley
 Danny Glover as Commander Philips

Production
The film was announced in February 2013 as a part of the initial season of the Walden Family Theater on the Hallmark Channel to air as its second original film in May 2013. Space Warriors premiered on May 31, 2013.

Reception
Common Sense Media rated it 3 out of 5 stars.

References

External links
 

2013 films
2013 television films
American television films
Films about astronauts
Films set in Alabama
Films shot at the U.S. Space & Rocket Center
2010s English-language films
Films directed by Sean McNamara